Little Eva Ascends is a 1922 American silent comedy film directed by George D. Baker and starring Gareth Hughes, Elinor Field and May Collins.

Cast
 Gareth Hughes as Roy St. George
 Elinor Field as Mattie Moore 
 May Collins as Priscilla Price
 Eunice Murdock Moore as Blanche St. George 
 Ben Hagerty as John St. George 
 Edward Martindel as 	Mr. Wilson
 Harry Lorraine as Junius Brutus
 Mark Fenton as 	Mr. Moore
 John T. Prince as 	Mr. Price 
 Fred Warren as 	Montgomery Murphy
 William H. Brown as Richard Bansfield

References

Bibliography
 Connelly, Robert B. The Silents: Silent Feature Films, 1910-36, Volume 40, Issue 2. December Press, 1998.
 Munden, Kenneth White. The American Film Institute Catalog of Motion Pictures Produced in the United States, Part 1. University of California Press, 1997.

External links
 

1922 films
1922 comedy films
1920s English-language films
American silent feature films
Silent American comedy films
American black-and-white films
Films directed by George D. Baker
Metro Pictures films
1920s American films